Psychrobacter alimentarius is a Gram-negative, non-spore-forming, nonmotile bacterium of the genus Psychrobacter which was isolated from squid jeotgal, a traditional Korean fermented seafood, in South Korea

References

External links
Type strain of Psychrobacter alimentarius at BacDive -  the Bacterial Diversity Metadatabase
 	

Moraxellaceae
Bacteria described in 2005